A list of films produced in the Soviet Union in 1951 (see 1951 in film).

1951

See also
1951 in the Soviet Union

External links
 Soviet films of 1951 at the Internet Movie Database

1951
Soviet
Films